Nev or NEV may refer to:

 Nev, a shortened form  of the given name Neville
 Nev, a common abbreviation of the U.S. State of Nevada
 nev, the ISO 639-3 language code for the Nyaheun language native to Laos

People
Nev Chandler (1946–1994), American sports broadcaster
Nev Cottrell (1927–2014), Australian rugby union footballer
Nev Edwards (born 1987), English rugby union player 
Nev Fountain, English writer
Nev Hewitt (1920–2016), Queensland-based Australian politician
Nev Schulman (born 1984), Israeli-American producer, actor and photographer
Nev Warburton (1932–2018), Queensland-based Australian politician

Others
Nev the Bear, a small, blue puppet bear appearing in the CBBC television programmes Smile and Bear Behaving Badly

Abbreviations
 National Electric Vehicle Sweden (NEV Sweden)
 Neighborhood Electric Vehicle, a U.S. denomination for battery electric vehicles 
 New energy vehicle, in China, vehicles that are partially or fully powered by electricity
 Vance W. Amory International Airport on the island of Nevis, Saint Kitts and Nevis (IATA airport code)
 North East Valley, a suburb of Dunedin, New Zealand

See also
Neev (disambiguation)